Saint-Martin is a parish municipality in the Beauce-Sartigan Regional County Municipality in the Chaudière-Appalaches region of Quebec, Canada. Its population is 2,588 as of the Canada 2021 Census. It is named after Martin of Tours.

Demographics

Population

Population trend:

Language
Mother tongue language (2021)

References

Parish municipalities in Quebec
Incorporated places in Chaudière-Appalaches